The 1976 United States Senate election in Indiana took place on November 2, 1976. Incumbent Democratic U.S. Senator Vance Hartke ran for re-election to a fourth term, but was defeated by Republican challenger Richard Lugar.

Democratic primary

Candidates
Vance Hartke, Incumbent U.S. Senator since 1959
Philip H. Hayes, U.S. Representative from Evansville

Results

Republican primary

Candidates
William P. Costas, businessman from Valparaiso
Richard Lugar, Mayor of Indianapolis and nominee for Senate in 1974
Edgar Whitcomb, former Governor of Indiana

Results

Results

See also 
 1976 United States Senate elections

References

Indiana
1976
1976 Indiana elections